Rory Atkins (born 12 July 1994) is a professional Australian rules football player who plays for the Gold Coast Suns in the Australian Football League (AFL).

Atkins played seven matches for SANFL club  in 2013, and twelve matches for Sturt's reserves team. Atkins performed impressively throughout the season, averaging 19 disposals and six marks per match, twice being named as an emergency for the Crows' senior AFL side, and finishing 6th in the reserves team's Club Champion award.

In February 2015, Atkins injured the posterior cruciate ligament in his right knee, resulting in him being sidelined for three months. After continuing to show good form, Atkins was selected in the AFL team's 25-man squad for the match against , but the match was cancelled due to the death of coach Phil Walsh. After returning to the reserves team the next week, Atkins finally made his debut against  the week after. He went on to play eight AFL games in the latter part of the season, making an impact with his pace and left-foot kicking.

Atkins played his 100th AFL game in round 3, 2020, against  at Metricon Stadium, but the milestone was not to be remembered as the Crows lost the match by 53 points. In  October 2020, Atkins exercised his rights as a free agent and joined  on a four-year deal.

Statistics
 Statistics are correct to the end of round 2, 2022

|- style="background:#eaeaea;"
! scope="row" style="text-align:center" | 2015
| style="text-align:center" | 
| 21 || 8 || 4 || 0 || 62 || 41 || 103 || 26 || 9 || 0.5 || 0.0 || 7.8 || 5.1 || 12.9 || 3.3 || 1.1 || 0
|-
! scope="row" style="text-align:center" | 2016
| style="text-align:center" | 
| 21 || 24 || 11 || 12 || 262 || 230 || 492 || 103 || 39 || 0.5 || 0.5 || 10.9 || 9.6 || 20.5 || 4.3 || 1.6 || 1
|- style="background:#eaeaea;"
! scope="row" style="text-align:center" | 2017
| style="text-align:center" | 
| 21 || 25 || 11 || 8 || 307 || 229 || 536 || 118 || 61 || 0.4 || 0.3 || 12.3 || 9.2 || 21.4 || 4.7 || 2.4 || 10
|-
! scope="row" style="text-align:center" | 2018
| style="text-align:center" | 
| 21 || 20 || 13 || 8 || 264 || 140 || 404 || 98 || 46 || 0.7 || 0.4 || 13.2 || 7.0 || 20.2 || 4.9 || 2.3 || 3
|- style="background:#eaeaea;"
! scope="row" style="text-align:center" | 2019
| style="text-align:center" | 
| 21 || 20 || 6 || 9 || 296 || 135 || 431 || 115 || 31 || 0.3 || 0.5 || 14.8 || 6.8 || 21.6 || 5.8 || 1.6 || 1
|-
! scope="row" style="text-align:center" | 2020
| style="text-align:center" | 
| 21 || 4 || 2 || 0 || 20 || 17 || 37 || 4 || 8 || 0.5 || 0.0 || 5.0 || 4.3 || 9.3 || 1.0 || 2.0 || 0
|- style="background:#eaeaea;"
! scope="row" style="text-align:center" | 2021
| style="text-align:center" | 
| 2 || 8 || 2 || 2 || 47 || 41 || 88 || 16 || 9 || 0.3 || 0.3 || 5.9 || 5.1 || 11.0 || 2.0 || 1.1 || 0
|-
! scope="row" style="text-align:center" | 2022
| style="text-align:center" | 
| 2 || 1 || 0 || 0 || 11 || 8 || 19 || 3 || 0 || 0.0 || 0.0 || 11.0 || 8.0 || 19.0 || 3.0 || 0.0 || TBA
|- class="sortbottom"
! colspan=3| Career
! 110
! 49
! 39
! 1269
! 841
! 2110
! 483
! 203
! 0.4
! 0.4
! 11.5
! 7.6
! 19.2
! 4.4
! 1.8
! 15
|}

Notes

References

External links

1994 births
Living people
Adelaide Football Club players
Calder Cannons players
Australian rules footballers from Victoria (Australia)
Sturt Football Club players
Adelaide Football Club (SANFL) players
Gold Coast Football Club players